Han Myeong-hui (born 20 November 1945) is a South Korean sprinter. She competed in the women's 400 metres at the 1964 Summer Olympics.

References

1945 births
Living people
Athletes (track and field) at the 1964 Summer Olympics
South Korean female sprinters
South Korean female middle-distance runners
Olympic athletes of South Korea
Place of birth missing (living people)
Asian Games medalists in athletics (track and field)
Asian Games silver medalists for South Korea
Athletes (track and field) at the 1966 Asian Games
Medalists at the 1966 Asian Games
Olympic female sprinters
20th-century South Korean women
21st-century South Korean women